Xenocypris is a genus of cyprinid fish found in eastern Asia.  There are currently seven species in this genus, one, X. yushensis, being known only from fossils, and one, X. yunnanensis, which is critically endangered or recently extinct.

Species
Xenocypris davidi Bleeker, 1871
Xenocypris fangi T. L. Tchang, 1930
Xenocypris hupeinensis (P. L. Yih, 1964)
Xenocypris macrolepis Bleeker, 1871 (Yellowfin)
Xenocypris medius (Ōshima, 1920)
Xenocypris yunnanensis Nichols, 1925
Xenocypris yushensis Liu & Su, 1962 (Pliocene Shanxi Province)

References
 

Cyprinid fish of Asia
Cyprinidae genera
Xenocyprinae
Taxa named by Albert Günther